Mohan Chandra Adhikari is a former communist politician in Nepal. He is from a Brahmin family in Morang District. Adhikari studied B.A., but didn't appear in the final exams. Adhikari had been a follower of Pushpa Lal Shrestha, but turned more radical than his mentor. Adhikari became a leader of the group in the Jhapa District Committee of the Communist Party which in the early 1970s intended to initiate a rebellion on the lines of the Naxalite insurgency in India.

Adhikari was arrested and sentenced to life imprisonment. He was saved from death sentence through a royal pardon. Whilst in jail, he was associated with the Communist Party of Nepal (Marxist-Leninist). Adhikari would spend 17 years in prison. He was sometimes called the 'Nelson Mandela' of Nepal.

After being released from jail, Adhikari became an advisory-member of the Communist Party of Nepal (Unified Marxist-Leninist). He also represented the party in the Upper House of Parliament. He was arrested during the 2006 Loktantra Andolan.

Adhikari later broke with communism, and became a Hindu leader. After the declaration of Nepal as a secular state, Adhikari participated in a meeting organised by the Shivsena Nepal.

Awards
Maha Ujwaol Rastradeep awards from the President of Nepal on 2021

References

Living people
Communist Party of Nepal (Amatya) politicians
Communist Party of Nepal (Marxist–Leninist) politicians
Communist Party of Nepal (Unified Marxist–Leninist) politicians
Members of the National Assembly (Nepal)
Nepalese prisoners sentenced to death
Prisoners sentenced to death by Nepal
Recipients of Nepalese royal pardons
Converts to Hinduism from atheism or agnosticism
Nepalese Hindus
People from Morang District
Year of birth missing (living people)
People of the Nepalese Civil War